Walter Cunningham Thomson (December 21, 1895 – April 27, 1964) was a politician, lawyer and rancher in Ontario, Canada. Thomson first ran for the leadership of the Ontario Liberal Party in 1943 but came in fourth place losing to Harry Nixon. He was first elected to the House of Commons of Canada in the 1949 federal election.

In 1951, he left federal politics and ran again for the leadership of the Ontario Liberal Party and won, defeating social reformer Harry Cassidy. In the 1951 Ontario provincial election, he failed to win election to the Legislative Assembly of Ontario, and the Liberals lost six of the 13 seats they had previously held. He remained leader of the party for another three years due to its state of disorganization, and was replaced by Farquhar Oliver in 1954.

External links
 

1895 births
1964 deaths
Canadian Presbyterians
Members of the House of Commons of Canada from Ontario
Liberal Party of Canada MPs
Leaders of the Ontario Liberal Party